McGuffey may refer to:

William Holmes McGuffey, American writer
The McGuffey Readers, written by William Holmes McGuffey
McGuffey, Ohio, a town in the United States
McGuffey School District, a school district in Western Pennsylvania, United States